Tapton Mount School, formerly Sheffield School for Blind Children, formerly Sheffield School for the Blind was a school for the visually impaired situated at 20 Manchester Road, Sheffield, South Yorkshire. It opened in 1879 at a cost of £15,000. In the 1960s and 1970s, the headmaster Frederick Tooze pioneered the integration of students into local comprehensive schools. It closed in 1997 after the pupil roll fell to twelve.

Alumni
Former Home Secretary, David Blunkett, attended the school between 1952 and 1959. His time at the school is described in his 1995 book, On a Clear Day.

References

Defunct schools in Sheffield
Educational institutions disestablished in 1997
Educational institutions established in 1879
Schools for the blind in the United Kingdom
1879 establishments in England
1997 disestablishments in England
Defunct special schools in England